Rockman.EXE may refer to:

 Mega Man (character), the main protagonist of the Mega Man multimedia franchise (known in Japan as Rockman.EXE)
 Mega Man Battle Network (originally titled Rockman.EXE in Japan), part of the Mega Man franchise of video games
 Mega Man Battle Network (video game), the first game in the series (released in Japan as Battle Network Rockman EXE)
 MegaMan NT Warrior (released in Japan under the name Rockman.EXE), the anime and manga series based upon the Battle Network series

See also
 Mega Man – a multimedia franchise known as Rockman  in Japan